Valery Vitalevich Likhodey (alternative spelling: Valerii Likhodei) (born 23 October 1986) is a Russian professional basketball player for BC Astana of the Kazakhstan Basketball Championship and the VTB United League.

Professional career
During his professional career, Likhodey has played with CSKA Moscow, CSK VVS Samara, Triumph Lyubertsy, Spartak Saint Petersburg.

In June 2012, he signed with Lokomotiv Kuban. In July 2014, he parted ways with Lokomotiv.

On 17 July 2014 he signed a one-year deal with UNICS Kazan. On 22 June 2015 he re-signed with UNICS for one more season.

On 29 June 2016 he signed with Khimki for the 2016–17 season.

In August 2017, he moved to Lithuanian club Nevėžis.

On 23 February 2018 Likhodey signed with the Italian club Orlandina Basket. In August 2018 he signed one year deal with polish Anwil Włocławek.

On 27 June 2019 he signed 1+1 year contract with UNICS of the VTB United League.

On 6 July 2020 he signed with Anwil Włocławek of the Polish Basketball League.

On 3 February 2021 he signed with Legia Warszawa of the Polish Basketball League.

On 21 November 2022 he signed with BC Astana of the Kazakhstan Basketball Championship and the VTB United League.

Awards and accomplishments

Club career
EuroCup champion: (2013)
FIBA EuroCup Challenge champion (2007)
Russian League All-Star: (2011)

Russian Junior National team
 2009 Summer Universiade:

References

External links
 Euroleague.net Profile
 Eurobasket.com Profile
 FIBA.com Profile

1986 births
Living people
BC Khimki players
BC Nevėžis players
BC Samara players
BC Spartak Saint Petersburg players
BC Zenit Saint Petersburg players
BC UNICS players
KK Włocławek players
Lega Basket Serie A players
Medalists at the 2009 Summer Universiade
Orlandina Basket players
PBC CSKA Moscow players
PBC Lokomotiv-Kuban players
Russian men's basketball players
Small forwards
Universiade medalists in basketball
Universiade silver medalists for Russia